Earl Beatty is a title in the Peerage of the United Kingdom. It was created in 1919 for the prominent naval commander Admiral of the Fleet Sir David Beatty. He was created Baron Beatty, of the North Sea and of Brooksby in the County of Leicester, and Viscount Borodale, of Wexford in the County of Wexford, at the same time,  also in the Peerage of the United Kingdom. The latter title is used as a courtesy title for the Earl's eldest son and heir apparent. Lord Beatty was succeeded by his eldest son, the second Earl. He represented Peckham in the House of Commons as a Conservative from 1931 to 1936 and briefly served as Under-Secretary of State for Air in Winston Churchill's 1945 caretaker government.  the titles are held by his eldest son, the third Earl, who succeeded in 1972.

Earl Beatty (1919)
David Richard Beatty, 1st Earl Beatty (1871–1936)
David Field Beatty, 2nd Earl Beatty (1905–1972)
David Beatty, 3rd Earl Beatty (born 1946)

The heir apparent is the present holder's son, Sean David Beatty, Viscount Borodale (born 1973), who works as a poet and artist, making scriptive and documentary poems written on location.
The heir apparent's heir apparent is his elder son, the Hon. Orlando Thomas Beatty (born 2003).

Line of succession

  Admiral of the Fleet David Richard Beatty, 1st Earl Beatty (1871–1936)
  David Field Beatty, 2nd Earl Beatty (1905–1972)
  David Beatty, 3rd Earl Beatty (born 1946)
 (1) Sean David Beatty, Viscount Borodale (born 1973)
 (2) Hon. Orlando Thomas Beatty (born 2003)
 (3) Hon. Louis David Beatty (born 2007)
 (4) Hon. Peter Wystan Beatty (born 1975)
 (5) Hon. Nicholas Duncan Beatty (born 1961)
 (6) David Brin Charles Beatty (born 1992)

Notes

References

Kidd, Charles, Williamson, David (editors). Debrett's Peerage and Baronetage (1990 edition). New York: St Martin's Press, 1990,

External links

Earldoms in the Peerage of the United Kingdom
Noble titles created in 1919